Events from the year 1709 in Scotland.

Incumbents 
 Secretary of State for Scotland: The Earl of Mar, until 3 February 1709; then The Duke of Queensberry

Law officers 
 Lord Advocate – Sir James Stewart; then Sir David Dalrymple, 1st Baronet
 Solicitor General for Scotland – William Carmichael; then Thomas Kennedy, jointly with Sir James Steuart, Bt.

Judiciary 
 Lord President of the Court of Session – Lord North Berwick
 Lord Justice General – Lord Tarbat
 Lord Justice Clerk – Lord Ormiston

Events 
 1 or 2 February – marooned Lower Largo-born privateer Alexander Selkirk, the original Robinson Crusoe, is rescued after four years living on the Juan Fernández Islands and begins his return to civilisation.
 26 April – Act of the General Assembly of the Church of Scotland for the provision of public libraries in presbyteries.
 3 May – Elspeth Rule becomes the last person in Scotland to be tried before the High Court of Justiciary for witchcraft; the judge, sitting at Dumfries, orders her to be burned on the cheek and banished from Scotland for life.
 1 July – Treason Act 1708 comes into force, harmonising the law of high treason in Scotland with that of England.
 Summer – bad weather causes a poor harvest with consequent distress.
 5 October – last Scottish coinage issued by a mint in Scotland, at Edinburgh.
 Society in Scotland for the Propagation of Christian Knowledge established by royal charter.
 Appointment of the first Chair of Oriental Languages in the University of Glasgow, Charles Morthland.
 First clout archery competition for the Edinburgh Arrow held by the Royal Company of Archers and won by David Drummond, advocate.

Births 
Date unknown
 John Armstrong, physician and poet (died 1779)

Deaths 
 24 June – Robert Lauder of Beilmouth, lawyer and Clerk of Exchequer

See also 
 1709 in Great Britain

References 

 
Years of the 18th century in Scotland
1700s in Scotland